Katrin Amunts is a German neuroscientist. She is the Professor of the  C. and O. Vogt Institute for Brain Research at the University of Düsseldorf and is also Director of the Institute of Neuroscience and Medicine in INM-1 in Forschungszentrum Jülich. She is one of the most prominent neuroscientists in brain mapping in the world. She is Scientific Research Director of the Human Brain Project.

Career 
Katrin Amunts was born in Potsdam, East Germany in 1962. She studied medicine and biophysics at Pirogov Medical School in the Soviet Union. She earned a doctorate in neuroscience and anatomy at the Institute of Brain Research in Moscow in 1989. She later trained at a Fraunhofer Institute in Berlin and joined the C. & O. Vogt Institute for Brain Research at the University of Düsseldorf. She was a professor in Aachen University before rejoining the University of Düsseldorf in 2013. Amunts is amongst the most important researchers in neuroscience today. In the recently published list of 10 Breakthrough Technologies 2014, the science magazine entitled JARA-BRAIN named her as a key player. Amunts works alongside a team of accomplished scientists, including a colleague named Professor Karl Zilles. Long term, Amunts’ goal in working with the human brain is to create a three-dimensional atlas mapped to the structures in the brain so as to allow its complicated configuration and functions to be imaged and understood microscopically. This would allow us to improve our understanding of the human's control center and advance our abilities to combat diseases or disorders such as depression, addiction, dementia, and Parkinson's disease. This construction is being called the “Big Brain.”

References 

German neuroscientists
German women neuroscientists
1962 births
Living people
German women academics
German women scientists
People from Potsdam
Academic staff of Heinrich Heine University Düsseldorf
20th-century German scientists
21st-century German scientists
20th-century women scientists
21st-century women scientists
Neuroimaging researchers
20th-century German women
21st-century German women